Shanghai Yuyuan Tourist Mart Co., Ltd. is the largest retailing conglomerate in China.

The company has presence in a variety of business sectors such as department stores and entertainment shops in Yuyuan Garden, Shanghai, the sales of gold, jade and other jewelry, food and beverages, Chinese pharmaceutical products, souvenirs, antiques, arts and crafts, the provision of property development, property management, import and export trading.

As at 19 November 2016, Yuyuan Tourist Mart is a constituent of SSE 180 Index.

History
Yuyuan Tourist Mart was formerly Yuyuan Shopping Mall, which was not a company but an administrative organization to manage the shops in Yuyuan Garden. In 1980s, some of the shops in there were integrated to form an enterprise. In 1987, Yuyuan Shopping Mall was approved to become the first commercial holding company in Shanghai. In 1988, its shares were listed on the Shanghai Stock Exchange and it was the first listed commercial holding company in China. In 1992, to unify the operations and management of the shopping mall, Shanghai Yuyuan Tourist Mart Co., Ltd. was established and listed on the Shanghai Stock Exchange to replace the old listed company.

Shareholders
In 2002, a consortium of Fosun High Technology (90%) and its major shareholder Guangxin Technology ( for 10%), acquired 20% of shares of Yuyuan Tourist Mart and became the largest shareholder. Fosun High Technology's parent company became Fosun International some time later, as well as Fosun High Technology acquired the 10% stake from Guangxin Technology.

Gallery

See also
Yuyuan Garden

References

External links

Shanghai Yuyuan Tourist Mart Company Limited

Companies based in Shanghai
Civilian-run enterprises of China
Tourist attractions in Shanghai
Retail companies of China
Culture in Shanghai
Chinese brands
Retail companies established in 1987
Fosun International
Companies listed on the Shanghai Stock Exchange
Privatization in China
Huangpu District, Shanghai